Ilie Popa (9 May 1940 – March 2016) was a Romanian racewalker. He competed in the men's 50 kilometres walk at the 1964 Summer Olympics.

References

External links
 

1940 births
2016 deaths
Athletes (track and field) at the 1964 Summer Olympics
Romanian male racewalkers
Olympic athletes of Romania
Place of birth missing